Banganga River is a trans-boundary river flowing from the hilly region of western Nepal to Uttar Pradesh of India. It crosses the border at Jugdihawa. The river is of religious importance for Buddhist pilgrims. The kingdom of Kapilavastu (Tilaurakot), the palace of Gautama Buddha, lies in the bank of the river. It is believed that, when Buddha left his palace to seek knowledge, he rode his horse along the bank of this river.

Biodiversity
About 29 species of fishes resides in the river. Among them, Order Siluriformes is the most dominant species followed by Cypriniformes, Perciformes and others.

See also
List of rivers of Nepal

References

Rivers of Nepal
History of Buddhism in Asia
Transborder rivers